Géraldine Grangier (born 13 February 1975) is a French politician of the National Rally. She has been a member of the National Assembly for Doubs's 4th constituency since the 2022 French legislative election in which she defeated En Marche! and former Socialist Party politician Frédéric Barbier.

Grangier was a social worker in Besançon before entering politics. She has also been a regional councilor in Besancon for the National Rally since 2019.

References

1975 births
Living people
Deputies of the 16th National Assembly of the French Fifth Republic
National Rally (France) politicians
21st-century French politicians
21st-century French women politicians

Politicians from Besançon